Jan Barbarič (born September 30, 1995) is a Slovenian professional basketball player who most recently played for KK Olimpija of the Slovenian League. He is a 1.88 m tall combo guard.

Professional career
Barbarič started playing professional basketball for Portorož.

On August 25, 2016, Barbarič signed a two-year contract with Union Olimpija.

References

External links
 Eurobasket.com profile
 Fiba Profile
 KZS Profile

1995 births
Living people
KK Olimpija players
Point guards
Shooting guards
Slovenian men's basketball players
Sportspeople from Koper